Bidzard (also Romanized as Bīdzard) is a village in Emamzadeh Jafar Rural District, in the Central District of Gachsaran County, Kohgiluyeh and Boyer-Ahmad Province, Iran. At the 2006 census, its population was 471, in 97 families.

References 

Populated places in Gachsaran County